Atınç Nukan (born 20 July 1993) is a Turkish professional footballer who plays as a centre-back for Göztepe.

Club career
Nukan began his career as a youth player for Beşiktaş. He made his professional debut on 7 May 2010 against Manisaspor, coming on shortly before half-time. In July 2015, Nukan signed five-year contract with German club RB Leipzig for €6 million. On 30 August 2016, Nukan returned to his former team Beşiktaş for one year on loan.

International career
He was called up to the national team by manager Fatih Terim for two friendlies in November 2015 against Qatar and Greece. He started in the game against Qatar in Doha where Turkey won 2–1.

Statistics

Club

International

Honours
Beşiktaş J.K.
Süper Lig: 2016–17
Turkish Cup: 2010–11

References

External links
 
 
 TFF profile 

1993 births
Living people
People from Fatih
Footballers from Istanbul
Turkish footballers
Turkey youth international footballers
Turkey under-21 international footballers
Turkey international footballers
Association football central defenders
Beşiktaş J.K. footballers
Süper Lig players
RB Leipzig players
2. Bundesliga players
Dardanelspor footballers
Turkish expatriate footballers
Turkish expatriate sportspeople in Germany
Expatriate footballers in Germany
Association football defenders